Mehmet Masum Suer is a documentary photographer and freelance journalist.

Personal life 
Suer was born on 15 October 1957 in Mardin, and lives in Diyarbakir, Turkey.

Career

Journalism 
He started his career as a journalist in 1974, and worked until 1993 as a reporter, photojournalist, writer, redactor and representative.

Photography 
In 1994, Suer stopped working in journalism history, culture and language research. After the year 2000, he still continued working in photography, but not related to journalism.

Suer has taken photographs of historical places and buildings, especially in the cities of Diyarbakir, Mardin, Van and Hasankeyf. He joined a project taking photos of famous Kurdish politicians and artists. His works are related to culture and history and also include works of art. Suer also takes photos of festivals and presentations.

Suer has had twelve exhibitions in Turkey, the region of Federal Kurdistan in Iraq, Belgium and the United States. His photos are used in tourist publications such as guidebooks, brochures and postcards, as well as in international tourist fairs, newspapers and magazines.

Recognition 
International photography magazine Light and Composition, has chosen 19 of Suer's photos as "Photo of the Day" and four as "Photo of the Month", for January 2014. Suer placed in Light and Composition's list of the "100 Best Photographers".

At the Arts and Culture Festival in the region of Federal Kurdistan in Iraq, he was awarded special honors.

Four of his photos have been printed as postage stamps.

References 

Living people
Kurdish journalists
Documentary photographers
1957 births